Marko Pjaca (born 6 May 1995) is a Croatian professional footballer who plays as a winger for  club Empoli, on loan from Juventus.

Pjaca began his professional club career in Croatia with Lokomotiva in 2012, before moving to Dinamo Zagreb in 2014. After winning consecutive domestic doubles with Dinamo, he joined Juventus in 2016, where he also won a domestic double in his first season. After his development was hindered by injuries, Pjaca was sent on a string of loans – to Schalke 04, Fiorentina, Anderlecht, Genoa and Torino.

At international level, Pjaca represented Croatia at UEFA Euro 2016 and at the 2018 FIFA World Cup, reaching the final of the latter tournament and making an appearance in it.

Early life
Pjaca's father Željko was a wrestler and his mother Višnja was a judoka. He has two elder sisters: Martina and Iva. In childhood, he trained in handball, basketball and table tennis.

Club career

Lokomotiva
Pjaca began his professional career with Croatian side Lokomotiva. He made his debut in the 2011–12 Croatian First Football League on 24 February 2012 in a 3–0 victory over Zadar, in which he managed an assist. It was his only appearance that season. The following season, Pjaca was much more prominent in the first team, particularly after the winter break. He ended the 2012–13 Prva HNL season with 2 goals in 17 appearances. However, it was his performances in the 2013–14 Prva HNL season which largely caught the eye of bigger clubs, with the winger scoring 7 times in 31 appearances.

Dinamo Zagreb
In summer 2014, Pjaca was signed by reigning Croatian First Football League champions Dinamo Zagreb for a transfer fee believed to be in the region of €1 million. He made his Dinamo debut in the opening match of the 2014–15 season, when he scored against Slaven Belupo. On 11 December 2014, he scored a hat-trick as Dinamo defeated Celtic 4–3 in the last match of the 2014–15 UEFA Europa League group stage. Pjaca finished the season with 14 goals in 47 appearances in all competitions, as Dinamo won the league title for the tenth-straight season. Pjaca also played the full match as Dinamo beat RNK Split in the 2015 Croatian Football Cup Final on penalties. On 20 July 2016, Pjaca himself confirmed that the 2016–17 UEFA Champions League second qualifying round tie against Macedonian club Vardar would be his last for Dinamo. He scored two goals, assisted for the third and received a standing ovation from the fans in his farewell match at the Stadion Maksimir.

Juventus
On 21 July 2016, it was announced Pjaca signed a five-year contract with Juventus for a €23 million transfer fee to Dinamo. With the transfer, Pjaca became the most expensive ever sale by Dinamo and the Croatian First Football League.

Pjaca made his Juventus and Serie A debut on 27 August, coming on as a substitute for Paulo Dybala in the second half of a 1–0 away win over Lazio. In October 2016, Pjaca suffered a cracked fibula while on international duty with Croatia, and was initially expected to miss around six weeks of the season. After being sidelined through injury for almost three months, in January 2017, he returned to action with two half-hour-long substitute appearances against Atalanta in the Coppa Italia and Fiorentina in Serie A. He scored his first goal for Juventus in the first leg of the Champions League round of 16 tie against Porto, a 2–0 away win. Pjaca suffered an anterior cruciate ligament (ACL) injury on 28 March while on international duty with Croatia, sidelining him for six months.

Loan to Schalke 04
After returning from a long term ACL injury, on 4 January 2018, it was announced that Pjaca had joined German club Schalke 04 on loan without an option to buy until the end of the 2017–18 season, for €800,000, plus an additional €200,000 in possible bonuses. At the moment German giants were chasing a place that takes them to the UEFA Champions League and coach Tedesco saw Marko as a player who can help them achieve their goals. On the other hand, in Schalke Marko could get his playing time to get back in his best form before the FIFA World Cup at the end of the season. Pjaca made his official club debut on 13 January, coming on as a second-half substitute in a 3–1 away defeat to RB Leipzig. In his second appearance for the club, and his first start, on 21 January, he scored his first goal in a 1–1 home draw against Hannover 96.

Loan to Fiorentina
On 7 August 2018, Pjaca joined Fiorentina on a season-long loan deal with the option to make the transfer permanent for an undisclosed fee.

Loan to Anderlecht 
On 31 January 2020, during the winter transfer deadline day, Belgian club Anderlecht signed Pjaca on loan until the end of the season.

Loan to Genoa 
On 19 September 2020, Pjaca moved on a season-long loan to Genoa. On his debut, on 20 September, Pjaca scored a goal in a 4–1 win against Crotone.

Loan to Torino 
On 28 July 2021, Pjaca joined Torino on loan with an option to buy.

Loan to Empoli 
On 1 September 2022, Pjaca moved on loan to Empoli, with an option to buy.

International career
Pjaca made his senior international debut for Croatia on 4 September 2014, replacing Mateo Kovačić for the last 12 minutes of a 2–0 friendly win over Cyprus at the Stadion Aldo Drosina in Pula. On 3 September 2015, he made his competitive debut for the national team in the UEFA Euro 2016 qualifying match against Azerbaijan, starting and playing the entire fixture, which ended in a 0–0 draw. On 4 June 2016, he scored his first international goal for Croatia in a 10–0 win over San Marino.

Euro 2016
Pjaca was included in Croatia's Euro 2016 squad. He played a major role in Croatia's impressive 2–1 victory against Spain, the reigning European champions, at Bordeaux's Nouveau Stade de Bordeaux. During that match, he completed an impressive seven of his eight attempted take-ons, took one shot, created one clear scoring opportunity and won one tackle. Pjaca took a seat on the substitutes' bench for the clash with Portugal in the next round, only to be brought on late in extra time with just ten minutes of the additional 30 remaining. Being introduced as a substitute, he brought some much-needed attacking impetus to the side, completing three dribbles against a previously impenetrable Portugal defence. Croatia eventually lost to Portugal 1–0 after Portugal's Ricardo Quaresma scored a 117th-minute winner to eliminate Croatia.

2018 World Cup
On 4 June 2018, Pjaca was named to Croatia's final 23-man squad for the 2018 FIFA World Cup. Croatia reached the final of the tournament, where they were defeated 4–2 by France on 15 July.

Pjaca's final appearance for the national team came against England in a 2–1 loss for the UEFA Nations League.

Style of play
Regarded as a talented and promising young prospect, Pjaca is a winger who is capable of playing on either flank, although his preferred position is on the left, where he likes to cut inside from wide positions and either shoot on goal or create chances with his stronger right foot; he has also been deployed as an attacking midfielder or as a second striker on occasion. A dynamic, agile and technically gifted player, Pjaca is known for his direct and offensive style of play. Due to his physique, speed, dribbling skills and ability to change direction quickly, he often takes on players in one-on-one situations, and is also known for his ability to make intelligent attacking runs behind the opponents' defensive line.

Career statistics

Club

International
Source:

Scores and results list Croatia's goal tally first

Honours
Dinamo Zagreb
Prva HNL: 2014–15, 2015–16
Croatian Cup: 2014–15, 2015–16

Juventus
Serie A: 2016–17, 2017–18
Coppa Italia: 2016–17

Croatia
FIFA World Cup runner-up: 2018

Individual
Football Oscar Best Prva HNL player: 2015, 2016

Orders
Order of Duke Branimir: 2018
Croatian Football League Team of the Year: 2014–15, 2015–16

References

External links

1995 births
Living people
Footballers from Zagreb
Croatian footballers
Association football wingers
NK Lokomotiva Zagreb players
GNK Dinamo Zagreb players
Juventus F.C. players
FC Schalke 04 players
ACF Fiorentina players
R.S.C. Anderlecht players
Genoa C.F.C. players
Torino F.C. players
Empoli F.C. players
Croatian Football League players
Serie A players
Bundesliga players
Belgian Pro League players
Croatia youth international footballers
Croatia under-21 international footballers
Croatia international footballers
UEFA Euro 2016 players
2018 FIFA World Cup players
Croatian expatriate footballers
Expatriate footballers in Belgium
Expatriate footballers in Germany
Expatriate footballers in Italy
Croatian expatriate sportspeople in Belgium
Croatian expatriate sportspeople in Germany
Croatian expatriate sportspeople in Italy